State Route 4 (SR 4) is a state highway in the eastern part of the U.S. state of Georgia. Except for its northernmost portion, it is completely concurrent for its entire length with U.S. Route 1 (US 1). It traverses south-to-north through portions of Charlton, Ware, Bacon, Appling, Toombs, Emanuel, Jefferson, and Richmond counties in the southeastern and east-central parts of the state. The highway begins at the Florida state line, on US 1/US 23/US 301/SR 15 at the St. Marys River. It travels to its northern terminus at the South Carolina state line, on the Augusta–North Augusta, South Carolina city line, on US 25 Business (US 25 Bus.) at the Savannah River.

Future
The portion from the southern part of Wrens to the central part of Augusta is part of the Fall Line Freeway, a highway that connects Columbus and Augusta. This portion may eventually be incorporated into the proposed eastern extension of Interstate 14 (I-14), which is currently entirely within Central Texas and may be extended into Augusta.

Widening project (Wadley to Wrens) 
The DOT will widen  of US 1/SR 4 from north of Wadley to Wrens and will be a total of $17M in budget. This project will Widen US 1/SR 4 from two lanes to a four-lane road (each having  in width). In a few years, it will be complete, and they'll move on to the next phase. This project will be completed on September 30, 2022.

Route description

Charlton County
SR 4 begins at the Florida state line, at a bridge over the St. Marys River, which is south-southeast of Folkston. This is where US 1/US 23/US 301 enter Georgia from Florida. US 1, US 23, US 301, SR 4, and SR 15 travel to the north-northwest as the Public Safety and Veterans Highway through rural parts of Charlton County. Immediately, they pass Lake Deborah to the east. They curve to the northwest for a brief portion. Just before entering Folkston, where they use the Second Street name, they resume their north-northwest direction. They have an intersection with the southern terminus of Third Street, a former portion of US 1. They pass an office for Georgia Power. At an intersection with Bay Street, they enter the main part of the city. They intersect the western terminus of SR 40 (Main Street). This intersection is just west of the Charlton County Courthouse. One block later is Love Street, a former portion of SR 252. Just north of Garden Street, they curve to the north-northeast. They then intersect SR 23/SR 121, which join the concurrency. This is one of a few seven-highway concurrencies in the state. The seven highways continue to the north-northeast. Just after curving back to the north-northwest, they intersect the western terminus of SR 40 Connector (SR 40 Conn.; Indian Trail). At this intersection, they pass the Charlton County Library. They then use the Okefenokee Trail as their path. They cross over Clay Branch just before intersecting the eastern terminus of Bowery Lane and the western terminus of Homeland Park Road. This intersection leads to the Okefenokee Industrial Park, the Charlton County Community Service Center, and the city hall of Homeland. Just north of Robin Lane, they leave Folkston and enter Homeland. Immediately, US 301 and SR 23 continue to the north-northwest, while US 1, US 23, SR 4, SR 15, and SR 121 curve to the west-northwest on the Woodpecker Trail. They cross over some railroad tracks of CSX. An intersection with the northern terminus of Dogwood Lane leads to the Homeland City Hall. At Louis West Lane, the highways leave Homeland and resume traveling through rural parts of the county. They cross over Little Spanish Creek and then Winding Branch. They intersect the southern terminus of Crews Road and the northern terminus of Old Dixie Highway, a former portion of US 1. Just after this intersection is a crossing over Spanish Creek. They curve to the north-northwest. They cross over Melton Branch. Then, in Racepond, SR 15/SR 121 splits off to the north-northeast, while US 1, US 23, and SR 4 continue to the north-northwest. They curve to a northwesterly direction and enter Ware County.

Ware County
US 1, US 23, and SR 4 cross over Gum Slough and then curve more to the west-northwest. They travel through Fort Mudge and the Dixon Memorial State Forest. They curve to the north-northwest and then intersect SR 177. They cross over Mill Creek before entering the southeastern part of Waycross.

Immediately, they pass an office of the Georgia Department of Corrections. Just before an intersection with the western terminus of Osburn Road, they curve back to the northwest. Just past The Mall at Waycross, they curve to the west-northwest. Just before an intersection with City Boulevard, they curve back to the northwest. They intersect the southern terminus of US 1 Bus./US 23 Bus./SR 4 Bus. (Memorial Drive) and US 82/SR 520 (South Georgia Parkway). US 1/US 23/SR 4 turn left onto US 82/SR 520 and travel concurrently with them. The five-highway concurrency travels to the west-southwest. Immediately, they curve to the west-northwest. An intersection with the southern terminus of Wilkerson Street leads to Memorial Stadium. The next street, Blackwell Street, leads to an office of the Okefenokee Humane Society. Between an intersection with the northern terminus of Amanda Street and one with the northern terminus of Morton Avenue, they cross over the city's drainage canal. An intersection with Lee Street leads to the downtown business district. An intersection with Brunel Street leads to Obediah's Okefenok and Swamp Road. At an intersection with Stephenson Street, the five highways curve to the northwest. On this curve, they travel on a bridge over Haines Avenue, some railroad tracks of CSX, and US 84/SR 38 (Plant Avenue). Immediately after this bridge, they curve back to the west-northwest. At McDonald Street, US 84 and SR 38 join the concurrency. The seven highways, US 1, US 23, US 82, US 84, SR 4, SR 38, and SR 520, continue to the west-northwest. At an intersection with Nicholls Street, they curve to the west-southwest and travel on a bridge over some railroad tracks of CSX. Just pass this bridge, they curve to the west-northwest. At Victory Drive, US 84 and SR 38 depart to the south. Just past this intersection, there is one with the southern terminus of South Augusta Avenue. Here, the highways pass South Georgia State College's Waycross campus. Between an intersection with the southern terminus of University Boulevard and one with Anita Street, they leave the city limits of Waycross.

Just west of Anita Street, they curve back to the west-southwest. They cross over Kettle Creek. A short distance later, they curve to the north-northwest. They intersect the eastern terminus of SR 122 (Carswell Avenue). They curve to the north-northeast and travel on a bridge over some railroad tracks of St. Mary's West Railroad. Immediately afterward, they travel on a bridge over Albany Avenue. the highways curve to the north-northwest and come to an intersection with Scapa Road. Here, US 1, US 23, and SR 4 turn right to the northeast, while US 82 and SR 520 continue straight ahead. Almost immediately, they intersect the western terminus of Fulford Road, which leads to the Ware County Sheriff's Office, the Southland Waste Transfer Station, the Ware County Emergency Management Agency, and the Waycross Regional Youth Detention Center. The three highways curve to the north-northwest and pass the Waycross–Ware County Industrial Park West. They curve to the west-northwest for a short distance and then curve to the northeast. They intersect the northern terminus of US 1 Bus./US 23 Bus./SR 4 Bus. (Alma Highway). The mainline highways head to the north-northwest and cross over Cox Creek. Almost immediately, they cross over the Satilla River on the Charles Ray King Memorial Bridge. They curve to a nearly due north direction. On a curve back to the north-northwest, they cross over Dryden Creek. They curve to the north and travel through Dixie Union. They curve to the north-northeast and travel on a bridge over Crawley Road and some railroad tracks of CSX. At an intersection with the northern terminus of Jamestown Road and the southern terminus of Alma–Waycross Highway, they enter Bacon County.

Bacon County
US 1, US 23, and SR 4 cross over Little Hurricane Creek on the PFC Clarence Loran Gaskins Memorial Bridge and then curve to the north-northwest. Upon entering Alma, they pass Bacon County High School Just south of an intersection with the eastern terminus of Floyd Street and the northern terminus of Radio Station Road, they begin a curve to the north-northeast. Just north of this intersection, they meet the southern terminus of the former SR 4 Alternate (SR 4 Alt.; South Dixon Street). North of 17th Street, they pass the Alma campus of Coastal Pines Technical College. The next block is an intersection with SR 32 (16th Street). Just north of 11th Street, the concurrency passes the Alma/Bacon County Public Library. Between 8th Street and 6th Street, the highways begin a curve to the north-northwest and pass the Alma Bacon County Welcome Center. They cross over Bear Branch and then meet the western terminus of Magnolia Drive, which leads to the Alma Bacon County Recreation Department. One block later, they intersect the northern terminus of the former SR 4 Alt. (North Dixon Street) and the western terminus of Camellia Drive. Here, they curve to the north. An intersection with the eastern terminus of Cumberland Road leads to the Bacon County Primary School. A short distance later, they curve to the north-northeast. They leave the city limits of Alma and cross over Hurricane Creek on the Curtis Lee Marion Bridge. They curve to a due north direction and travel on the Jauquion R. "Rab" Tanner Bridge. The highways curve back to the northeast just before an intersection with the southern terminus of SR 19. Here, US 23 departs the concurrency on SR 19. US 1 and SR 4 continue to the northeast and cross over Big Satilla Creek and enter Appling County.

Appling County
US 1 and SR 4 continue to the northeast. Just before an intersection with the eastern terminus of Versie Aldridge Road and the western terminus of Cauley Road, they curve to the north-northeast. Just before an intersection with the eastern terminus of Buck Head Road, they curve back to the northeast. An intersection with the eastern terminus of the appropriately-named Airport Road leads to Baxley Municipal Airport. The highways cross over Blackwater Creek and then curve back to the north-northeast. They cross over Sweetwater Creek and then enter Baxley. An intersection with Johns Lane leads to Appling County Elementary School. At an intersection with Second Street, they begin a second concurrency with SR 15. An intersection with the eastern terminus of Bay Street leads to Lake Mayers Public Park. US 1, SR 4, and SR 15 cross over some railroad tracks of Norfolk Southern Railway just before intersecting US 341/SR 27 (Parker Street). Around an intersection with the eastern terminus of Ivey Street, the three highways curve to the north-northwest. At the northern terminus of Brobston Street, they curve back to the north-northeast. At an intersection with Sursson Street, they temporarily leave the city limits of Baxley. At an intersection with the southern terminus of Nails Ferry Road, they re-enter the city. After curving back to the north-northwest, they leave Baxley for the final time. They cross over Tenmile Creek. They curve to a due north direction and cross over Little Tenmile Creek.  After crossing over Bay Creek, they cross over an industrial railway. An intersection with the eastern terminus of West River Road leads to Deen's Landing, an Altamaha River waterway public landing. They pass a picnic area just before crossing over the Altamaha River on the Joseph Simmons Alexander, Sr. Memorial Bridge to enter Toombs County.

Toombs County
US 1, SR 4, and SR 15 continue to the north-northeast. After crossing over Williams Creek, they enter the unincorporated community of English Eddy. They curve to the north-northwest. Just before an intersection with the western terminus of SR 147 and the eastern terminus of Cedar Crossing Road, they curve to a more northern direction. After leaving English Eddy, they curve to the north-northeast. After crossing over Cobb Creek, the three-highway concurrency, they curve back to the north-northwest. After curving to the north, they enter the unincorporated community of Toombs Central. There, they intersect SR 56. Then, they pass Toombs Central Elementary School and the Toombs County Recreation Department. After leaving Toombs Central, they curve to the north-northwest. In the unincorporated community of South Thompson, they begin a curve back to the north-northeast. They intersect the southern terminus of SR 29. Here, SR 15 splits off onto SR 29. US 1 and SR 4 curve to the northeast and cross over Rocky Creek. They curve back to the north-northeast and cross over Little Rocky Creek. They then travel through Santa Claus. Approximately  later, they enter Lyons. They pass Lyons Upper Elementary School and then curve to the northeast. They meet the western terminus of SR 178 (South Victory Drive). They begin a curve to the north-northwest. An intersection with South Washington Street leads to Partin Park and the Lyons Recreation Department. They intersect US 280/SR 30 (Liberty Avenue). Just after this intersection, US 1 and SR 4 enter downtown Lyons. They cross over some railroad tracks of Georgia Central Railway. Immediately afterward, they intersect SR 292 and the western terminus of SR 152 (Broad Street). After leaving downtown, they pass the Lyons Police Department. Intersections with Cleveland Avenue and Toombs Avenue lead to Toombs County High School's football stadium. Just after leaving Lyons, they cross over Swift Creek and curve to the north-northeast. They intersect the eastern terminus of SR 130 and the western terminus of Resmando Road. The roadway curves to the northeast for a short distance and then resume their north-northeast direction. They cross over Pendleton Creek. They travel through rural areas with agricultural land on both sides of the roadway before entering Emanuel County.

Emanuel County
US 1 and SR 4 immediately curve to the northwest. Just before Harrell Cemetery Road, they curve back to the north-northeast. They enter Oak Park. They begin a curve back to the northwest. Immediately after this curve begins, they cross over Reedy Creek. Then, they curve back to the north-northeast and intersect SR 46/SR 86. Here, SR 46 joins the concurrency. The three highways curve to the northeast and cross over the Ohoopee River. They curve back to the north-northeast and meet a former portion of SR 46. Then, they have an interchange with Interstate 16 (I-16; Jim L. Gillis Highway). Just past this interchange, SR 46 splits off to the east. As of this point, they are known as Bill English Highway. Just after beginning a curve to the north-northwest, they leave Oak Park. They have an intersection with the western terminus of SR 192 and the southern terminus of New Hope Church Road. The concurrency curves back to the north-northeast and crosses over Jacks Creek. Just south of Ivy W. Rountree Road, they curve back to the north-northeast. Just before curving back to the north-northwest, SR 57 joins the concurrency. They curve to the northwest and then intersect the northern terminus of SR 297. Here, they take on the Larry J. "Butch" Parrish Parkway name. They intersect the southern terminus of US 1 Bus./SR 4 Bus., which leads to Swainsboro. They briefly enter the city limits of Swainsboro. There, they intersect Empire Expressway and travel on a bridge over some railroad tracks of Heart of Georgia Railroad. Just after this, they cross over Crooked Creek. They intersect SR 56 and curve to the north-northwest. After an intersection with US 80/SR 26 on the southwestern edge of the city, US 1, SR 4, and SR 56 travel just to the west of Holloways Pond. They curve to the north-northwest, very briefly re-enter the city, and then travel just to the west of Emanuel County Airport. They curve back to the north-northeast and intersect the northern terminus of Kight Road, a former segment of SR 57. At this intersection, SR 57 splits off to the northwest. They then meet the northern terminus of US 1 Bus./SR 4 Bus. The highways curve back to the north-northwest. They meet a former portion of US 1 that travels through Dellwood just before intersecting the western terminus of Dellwood Connector, which leads to Dellwood. On the northern side of Dellwood, they meet this former portion of the highway. They curve to a nearly due north direction and then back to the north-northeast. They travel through the unincorporated community of Blundale. The highways curve to the northwest and then back to the north-northwest. Then, they cross over Rocky Creek to enter Jefferson County.

Jefferson County
US 1 and SR 4 curve to the north-northeast and intersect the southern terminus of US 1 Bus./SR 4 Bus. and the northern terminus of Kennedy Road. They cross over Williamson Swamp Creek and enter Wadley. Just after a curve to the north-northwest, they travel on a bridge over some railroad tracks of Norfolk Southern Railway. They intersect SR 78 and the northern terminus of US 319 (East Calhoun Street). The two highways curve back to the north-northeast and then back to the north-northwest. Just south of an intersection with the northern terminus of Martin Luther King Jr. Boulevard and the southern terminus of Lincoln Park Road. Just after this curve, they intersect the northern terminus of US 1 Bus./SR 4 Bus. They head to the north-northeast and cross over Boggy Gut Creek. They intersect the eastern terminus of Moxley–Bartow Road and the western terminus of Pete Smith Road, the latter of which leads to the unincorporated community of Moxley. In Aldreds, an intersection with the eastern terminus of Walden Brett Road leads to the unincorporated community of Pine Hill. The concurrency curves to a nearly due north direction and meet the northern terminus of a former portion of US 1 before crossing over the Ogeechee River. They curve to the north-northwest and enter Louisville. Immediately, they have an intersection with the southern terminus of US 1 Bus./SR 4 Bus. and the western terminus of Bob Culvern Road. There is no access from Bob Culvern Road to the business routes or vice versa. This intersection is just west of Louisville Municipal Airport. They have an intersection with SR 17 and the eastern terminus of Midville Road. Here, SR 17 joins the concurrency. They travel just east of Lake Marion and intersect SR 24 (Mulberry Street). An intersection with the western terminus of the appropriately-named School Street leads to Louisville Middle School. Just before an intersection with the eastern terminus of Walnut Street and the western terminus of Middleground Road, the roadway begins a curve to the northwest. They curve back to the north-northwest and intersect US 221 and the northern terminus of US 1 Bus./SR 4 Bus. (Peachtree Street). Here, US 221 joins the concurrency. The four highways travel in a nearly due north direction between the Jefferson County Jail and Law Enforcement Facility and the Louisville Golf Club, passing the Thomas Jefferson Academy. They then pass the Jefferson County Health Center. They curve to the north-northwest and intersect Clark Mill By-Pass, which leads to the Jefferson County Landfill. Just north of this intersection, the roadway leaves Louisville. They bend to a more northern direction and pass Jones Pond. They curve to the north-northeast and intersect the southern terminus of SR 296. They pass Jefferson County High School just before intersecting the eastern terminus of Warrior Trail, which also leads to the Jefferson County Landfill. They pass Adams Lake and then curve to the northeast before crossing over Big Creek. They curve to the north-northwest and then back to a northern direction. They enter Wrens and curve to the north-northeast. Immediately, they intersect SR 88/SR 540 (Fall Line Freeway), which both join the concurrency. The six highways head into the main part of the city. They cross over some railroad tracks of Norfolk Southern Railway. They curve to the northeast and cross over Brushy Creek. They curve to the north-northeast and intersect the western terminus of Howard Street and the southern terminus of Thomson Highway. Here, SR 17 splits off onto Thomson Highway. Then, they intersect SR 80 (Broad Street). Here, SR 88 splits off to the right. The four highways continue to the northeast and pass Wrens Middle School. The concurrency curves to the northeast and intersects Quaker Road, which functions as a northern bypass of the city. A short distance later, they intersect the eastern terminus of SR 47. Here, US 221 splits off to the north-northwest. US 1, SR 4, and SR 540 cross over Reedy Creek on the Floyd L. Norton Memorial Bridge. An intersection with the southern terminus of Woodland Academy Road and the northern terminus of Camp Ground Road leads to WCES TV 20. They begin paralleling the southeastern edge of Fort Gordon. They then cross over Brier Creek and enter Richmond County and the city limits of Augusta.

Richmond County
US 1, SR 4, and SR 540 curve to the east-northeast and cross over Boggy Gut Creek. After curving back to the northeast, they cross over Sandy Run Creek. Then, they curve to the east, before curving to the east-northeast. The highways leave Augusta, enter the city limits of Blythe, and temporarily leave the edge of Fort Gordon. They intersect the western terminus of Church Street, which leads to Blythe city hall, a U.S. Post Office, and Blythe Elementary School. They begin a curve to the northeast. On this curve they intersect SR 88 and the southern terminus of Hoods Chapel Road. They leave Blythe and re-enter Augusta. They curve to the north-northeast and cross over South Prong Creek. The concurrency begins to parallel the southeastern edge of Fort Gordon again and begins to curve back to the northeast. On this curve, they cross over Spirit Creek. This crossing is just south of Gordon Lakes Golf Course. They intersect the northern terminus of Willis Foreman Road, which is a connector to US 25/SR 121. This is before an interchange with Tobacco Road, which leads to Fort Gordon's Gate 5. Just after this interchange, they have an intersection with a former portion of US 1. They cross over Butler Creek, meet another former portion of US 1, and curve to the east-northeast to an intersection with the northern terminus of Meadowbrook Drive and the southern terminus of Barton Chapel Road. The roadway begins a curve back to the northeast. At an interchange with I-520 (Bobby Jones Expressway; and its unsigned companion designation SR 415), both SR 540 and the Fall Line Freeway end. US 1 and SR 4 pass Augusta Technical College and then intersect Lumpkin Road, which functions as a bypass south of the main part of Augusta. They then meet Wheeless Road, which helps connect the southern and central parts of the city. They pass Hillcrest Memorial Cemetery before meeting the northern terminus of Richmond Hill Road. They cross over Rocky Creek just before intersecting US 78/US 278/SR 10 (Gordon Highway). Here, US 1 turns right onto US 78/US 278/SR 10, while SR 4 begins a curve to the east and takes on the Milledgeville Road name. It passes Wilkinson Gardens Elementary School. At an intersection with Olive Road, the local name changes to Martin Luther King Jr. Boulevard. At an intersection with the northern terminus of 15th Avenue and the southern terminus of 15th Street, SR 4 turns left onto 15th Street. Just past an intersection with the eastern terminus of Government Road and the western terminus of Carver Drive, they have a partial interchange with Poplar Street and Wrightsboro Road. There is no access from Poplar Street or Wrightsboro Road to SR 4 or from southbound SR 4 to the local streets. Then, the highway travels on the Rosa T. Beard Memorial Bridge over Poplar Street, Wrightsboro Road, and some railroad tracks of CSX. Here, it begins traveling along the southwestern edge of the Medical District. It intersects the eastern terminus of Central Avenue. It skirts along the eastern edge of Paine College. At an intersection with Laney Walker Boulevard, which leads to the college and the Health Sciences campus of Augusta University, the highway enters the Medical District proper. It intersects the eastern terminus of Pope Avenue and the western terminus of Harper Street, the latter leads to the Augusta VA Medical Center and Augusta University Medical Center. At an intersection with Walton Way, SR 4 turns right and follows Walton Way to the east-southeast. It meets St. Sebastian Way, which leads to the Heart and Vascular Institute of University Hospital. An intersection with D'Antignac Street leads to the main and emergency entrances of University Hospital. The highway intersects 13th Street. Here, SR 4 turns left and follows that street to the north-northeast. Immediately, it crosses over Augusta Canal and leaves the Medical District. An intersection with the eastern terminus of Independence Drive leads to Walton Rehabilitation Hospital and Meadow Garden, home of George Walton, a signer of the United States Declaration of Independence. Just after this, it crosses over some railroad tracks of CSX and then passes the John S. Davidson Fine Arts Magnet School. It then crosses over Hawks Gully, a side tributary of Augusta Canal. Just after this crossing is an intersection with the eastern segment of Telfair Street. It travels under a bridge that carries SR 28 (John C. Calhoun Expressway). An intersection with the eastern segment of Greene Street leads to Sacred Heart Cultural Center and Augusta Canal Discovery Center. It intersects the eastern segment of Ellis Street, which functions like an alternate route for most of the east–west streets in downtown. The highway then intersects US 25 Bus. (Broad Street), which leads to the city's visitor center. Here, US 25 Bus. joins SR 4 in a concurrency. This intersection is just east of Curtis Baptist School. The highways meet Jones Street, the eastern terminus of the eastbound lanes of SR 104. The next intersection is with Reynolds Street, the eastern terminus of the westbound lanes of SR 104. They cross over the Savannah River on the James U. Jackson Memorial Bridge. Here, SR 4 ends and US 25 Bus. enters North Augusta, South Carolina.

National Highway System
The entire length of SR 4 is part of the National Highway System, a system of routes determined to be the most important for the nation's economy, mobility, and defense.

History

1920s
The roadway that would eventually become SR 4 was established at least as early as 1919 as part of SR 15 from the Florida state line through Waycross and to Alma, an unnumbered road from Alma, SR 17 from Swainsboro to Louisville, and another unnumbered road from Louisville to Augusta. By September 1921, SR 32 was proposed on the Alma–Baxley segment. SR 17 was proposed from Baxley through Lyons to Swainsboro. It was also placed on the Louisville–Wrens segment. SR 24 was designated on the Louisville–Augusta segment, via Wrens. By October 1926, US 1 was designated on the current path. The route of SR 15 between Alma and Hazlehurst, including its concurrency with US 1, was shifted to the east-northeast. SR 32 was designated on the Alma–Baxley segment, with a concurrency with US 1/SR 15 from Alma north to a point southwest of Baxley. By October 1929, SR 4 was designated on the current path. The eastern terminus of SR 32 was truncated to Alma. SR 15's southern terminus was removed from US 1 and truncated to the northern end of its former concurrency with US 1 north of Alma, at what is the current northern end of the concurrency that US 1/SR 4 have with US 23. SR 24's Louisville–Augusta segment was shifted to the southeast to travel between Louisville and Waynesboro. SR 17's southern terminus was truncated to Wrens.

1930s
In January 1932, the southern terminus of SR 17 was extended on US 1 and SR 4 from south-southeast of Wrens to Louisville and then to the southeast to Midville and then east-southeast to Millen. In the first third of 1937, SR 23 was extended west-southwest from Folkston to Saint George, but there was no indication of a concurrency with US 1/SR 4. The 1938 GDOT map was the first one that had an inset map of Augusta. It indicated that US 1 and SR 4 entered the main part of the city on Deans Bridge Road, like it currently does. It intersected US 78/SR 10/SR 12 (Milledgeville Road). This intersection was the eastern terminus of SR 12 at the time. US 1, US 78, SR 4, and SR 10 followed Milledgeville Road to the east-southeast. They intersected US 25/SR 21 (Savannah Road). This intersection was the northern terminus of SR 21 at the time. The five highways traveled northeast on Twiggs Street. They curved to the north-northeast onto 7th Street (listed as "Seventh Street" on the map). At SR 28 (Broad Street), US 25 turned left to the west-northwest, while US 1, US 78, SR 4, and SR 10 turned right to the east-southeast. At an intersection with 5th Street, the four highways split off of SR 28 to the north-northeast and traveled to the South Carolina state line. At the end of 1939, SR 57's eastern terminus was extended from Swainsboro to just north of Oak Park, forming a concurrency with US 1 and SR 4 between the two points.

1940s and 1950s
In the first quarter of 1940, the northern end of the segment of SR 17 concurrent with US 1 and SR 4 north of Louisville was shifted north-northeast to Wrens. Between January 1945 and November 1946, SR 46 was placed on a concurrency with US 1/SR 4 in Oak Park. By March 1948, US 301 was placed on its concurrency with US 1/SR 4 between Florida and Homeland.

Between April 1949 and August 1950, US 23 was placed on its current concurrency with US 1/SR 4 and US 301. Between September 1953 and June 1954, US 221's northern terminus was extended from southwest of Louisville into South Carolina, including its concurrency with US 1/SR 4 and SR 17 from Louisville to Wrens. Between June 1954 and June 1955, US 1, US 78, and SR 4 were indicated to have split off from US 25 at the southern terminus of 7th Street to continue following Twiggs Street to the northeast. They turned right onto Calhoun Street (now part of Walton Way) and followed it to the east-southeast to 5th Street. From that intersection, they resumed their north-northeast direction. By July 1957,  SR 4 was shifted off of US 1 and US 78 in Augusta. It was indicated to follow Deans Bridge Road, Milledgeville Road, and Twiggs Street like before, with US 1 and US 78, along with US 25, US 278, and SR 10 was shifted onto Gordon Highway. SR 4 was shown to follow 7th Street to Broad Street, but there was no indication as to whether if followed US 25 north/SR 28 west or US 25 south/SR 28 east. Between July 1957 and June 1960, SR 21 was extended along SR 4 from the meeting point of Milledgeville Road, Savannah Road, and Twiggs Street, and followed Twiggs Street and 7th Street to Broad Street, along with SR 4. US 25 was shifted off of Broad Street and followed US 1, US 78, US 278, and SR 10 along Gordon Highway to the state line. Its former path on Broad Street and 13th Street was redesignated as US 25 Bus.

1960s
By June 1963, SR 15 was shifted to its current concurrency with US 1/US 23/SR 4 between Florida and Racepond and on US 1/SR 4 from Baxley to South Thompson. SR 121 was extended south-southeast along US 1/US 23/SR 4 (and SR 15) from Racepond to Folkston. By 1966, SR 88 was extended to the Sandersville area, thereby traveling on a concurrency with US 1/US 221/SR 4 and SR 17 in Wrens. The 1966 GDOT map was the first one with an inset map of Waycross. It indicated that US 1/US 23/SR 4 entered the city from the southeast on Memorial Drive. They began a concurrency with US 84/SR 50. At Plant Avenue, US 84 split off to the southwest. US 1, US 23, SR 4, SR 38, and SR 50 traveled to the northeast. At Albany Street, SR 50 split off to the west-northwest. At this intersection, US 82 joined the concurrency. At State Street, US 1, US 23, and SR 4 split off to the northwest. A northwestern bypass of Waycross, from US 82/SR 50 at the midway point between Waresboro and Waycross to US 1/US 23/SR 4 south-southeast of Dixie Union. In Augusta, SR 12 was extended along SR 4, along Milledgeville Road, where it ended at SR 21 (Savannah Road). From the 7th Street–Broad Street intersection, SR 21 was shown to have followed US 25 Bus./SR 28 to the west-northwest on Broad Street to 13th Street and then on 13th Street to the South Carolina state line. That year, SR 4 was removed from US 1 in the Wadley and Louisville areas. Its former path in each city was redesignated on US 1 and US 221 as SR 4 Bus. The next year, US 1 in both Wadley and Louisville was shifted eastward, onto SR 4. The former path on SR 4 Bus. was redesignated as US 1 Bus.

1970s and 1980s
In 1978, a southern bypass of the main part of Waycross, designated as SR 714, was proposed from SR 122 west-southwest of the city to US 1/US 23/SR 4 southeast of it.

In 1980, SR 12's eastern terminus was truncated off SR 4 to end at its intersection with SR 4. The next year, SR 12's eastern terminus was further truncated to its current location, near Thomson, with the part of Milledgeville Road that is not part of SR 4 relinquished to local control. Also, the northern terminus of SR 21 was truncated to Millen. SR 4's path in Augusta was shifted to its current path. In 1982, a proposal to extend SR 714 was shown to have extended from just south of SR 122 north-northwest to US 82/SR 50 east-southeast of Waresboro (meeting the bypass road for the northwestern part of Waycross), and then west-northwest to another meeting point with US 82/SR 50 on the western edge of Waresboro. Between January 1984 and January 1986, the path of US 82 and SR 50 was shifted onto Reynolds Street, Jane Street, Francis Street, and the path of SR 714. US 84 was shifted onto Reynolds Street, as well. In 1988, the eastern terminus of SR 50 was truncated to Dawson. Its former path, on US 82 and US 84, was redesignated as SR 520.

1990s to 2010s
In 1992, a northwestern bypass of Waycross, designated as SR 896, was proposed from US 82/SR 520 east-southeast of Waresboro to US 1/US 23/SR 4 north-northeast of Waresboro. In 1995, the path of US 1, US 23, and SR 4 through the Waycross, Georgia micropolitan area was shifted to the west, replacing the route of SR 896. The former path was redesignated as US 1 Bus., US 23 Bus., and SR 4 Bus. In 2002, a southwesterly bypass of Swainsboro was proposed from the intersection of US 1/SR 4 and SR 297 south-southeast of the city to US 1/SR 4 north-northwest of it. In 2004, the path of US 1 and SR 4 through the Swainsboro area was shifted to the west, onto the proposed bypass. Their former path was redesignated as US 1 Bus./SR 4 Bus. GDOT announced to the public that the portion of US 1/SR 4 between the southern part of Wrens and the interchange with I-520 was also designated as SR 540, as part of the Fall Line Freeway, on September 24, 2018.

Major intersections

Special routes

Waycross business loop

State Route 4 Business (SR 4 Bus.) is a  business route of SR 4 partially in the city limits of Waycross. It is concurrent with US 1 Bus. and US 23 Bus. for its entire length. US 1 Bus./SR 4 Bus. was established in 1996, replacing the old mainline US 1/SR 4 through Waycross, via Memorial Drive, Plant Avenue, State Street, and Alma Highway. Except for the far northern end, the entire length of SR 4 Bus. is part of the National Highway System, a system of routes determined to be the most important for the nation's economy, mobility, and defense.

Alma spur route

State Route 4 Spur (SR 4 Spur) was a spur route of SR 4 that existed in the Alma area. It was established between the beginning of 1945 and the end of 1946, from SR 32 just west of the city to US 1/US 23/SR 4 north of it. In 1953, a local road was established from US 1/US 23/SR 4 south of Alma to SR 4 Spur/SR 32 just west of the city. In 1976, SR 4 Spur was extended around the southwestern and southern edges of the city. In 1980, it was redesignated as SR 4 Alt.

Alma alternate route

State Route 4 Alternate (SR 4 Alt.) was a  alternate route of SR 4 in Alma that traveled south-to-north through the western part of the city. 

It began at an intersection with the US 1/US 23/SR 4 mainline (Pierce Street) just south of the main part of Alma, although US 23 is not signed here. It traveled to the west-northwest on South Dixon Street and immediately curved to the northwest. Just past an intersection with the eastern terminus of Oak Street and the southern terminus of South Thomas Street, SR 4 Alt. began to gradually curve to the north-northwest. Just past an intersection with South Church Street, it passed an office of the Bacon County Department of Family and Children Services. It then intersected SR 32 (West 16th Street). At an intersection with the western terminus of West 15th Street, the alternate route curved to the north-northeast. At an intersection with 12th Street, it passed the Bacon County Courthouse and its local name changed to North Dixon Street.

Just south of Wall Street, it curved to the north-northwest for nearly one block. At an intersection with West 11th Street, it curved back to the north-northeast. An intersection with 6th Street led to the Alma, Bacon Co., GA Historical Society. Just north of an intersection with the northern terminus of Mercer Street, it began a curve to a nearly due north direction. The highway crossed over Bear Branch. It then curved to the east-northeast and intersected US 1/US 23/SR 4 (North Pierce Street). Here, SR 4 Alt. ended, and the roadway continues as Camellia Drive.

In the mid-1940s, SR 4 Spur was established on this same highway, but only on the part north of SR 32. In 1976, SR 4 Spur was extended to its southern terminus. In 1980, it was redesignated as SR 4 Alt.

SR 4 Alt. was removed from the Georgia state route system on August 17, 2017, per Order of the Commissioner 3639.

Swainsboro business loop

State Route 4 Business (SR 4 Bus.) is a  business route of SR 4 that is partially within the city limits of Swainsboro. It is concurrent with U.S. Route 1 Business (US 1 Bus.) for its entire length. The entire length of SR 4 Bus. is part of the National Highway System, a system of routes determined to be the most important for the nation's economy, mobility, and defense.

In 2003, a western bypass of Swainsboro was proposed. The next year, US 1/SR 4 were shifted onto this bypass. Their former path through the city was redesignated as US 1 Bus./SR 4 Bus.

Wadley business loop

State Route 4 Business (SR 4 Bus.) is a  business route of SR 4 that is mostly within the city limits of Wadley. It is concurrent with U.S. Route 1 Business (US 1 Bus.) for its entire length. It travels north through the heart of downtown,  while the main route of US 1/SR 4 heads through the eastern part of the city. In 1966, SR 4 Bus. was established from US 1/SR 4 south-southeast of Wadley to US 1/SR 4 north of it. The next year, US 1 Bus. was established on the route of SR 4 Bus.

Louisville business loop

State Route 4 Business (SR 4 Bus.) is a  business route of SR 4 completely within the city limits of Louisville. It is concurrent with U.S. Route 1 Business (US 1 Bus.) for its entire length. In 1966, SR 4 through the city was shifted off of US 1. Its former path became SR 4 Bus. The next year, US 1 was shifted off of SR 4 Bus. and onto SR 4. Its former path was redesignated as US 1 Bus.

See also

References

External links

004
Transportation in Charlton County, Georgia
Transportation in Ware County, Georgia
Transportation in Bacon County, Georgia
Transportation in Appling County, Georgia
Transportation in Toombs County, Georgia
Transportation in Emanuel County, Georgia
Transportation in Jefferson County, Georgia
Transportation in Richmond County, Georgia
Waycross, Georgia micropolitan area
Transportation in Augusta, Georgia